The Assabet Valley Patriots are one of the longest standing  members of the Metropolitan Boston Hockey League. Based in Concord, Massachusetts and founded in 1977, the Assabet Valley Hockey Minor Hockey Association ("AVMHA") has teams competing in the Minor hockey Divisions  Mite, Squirt, Pee Wee, Bantam, and Midget age divisions.

Assabet Valley Patriots Girls team 12U won the national championship at several different times. There 07/08 peewee major team won the MBHL championship, defeating the number 1 seed, CD selects, who are based in Albany, NY. Assabet Valley Bantam Minor of 07/08 won the MBHL, going 32-0 in the regular season. Also the Bantam major 07/08 won the MBHL.

External links
 Official website

1977 establishments in Massachusetts
Concord, Massachusetts
Ice hockey clubs established in 1977
Ice hockey teams in Massachusetts
Sports in Middlesex County, Massachusetts